Canisius High School is a Catholic, private college-preparatory school for young men run by the USA Northeast Province of the Society of Jesus in Buffalo, New York, United States, just north of the Delaware Avenue Historic District. Founded in 1870, the school has historical ties to Canisius College. Canisius operates independently from the New York State guidelines established by the Board of Regents. It has the largest high school student population among private schools in Western New York.

History
In 1850, a group of Jesuits left Europe in response to Bishop John Timon's call for a Catholic institution to serve European immigrants settling in Western New York. The Jesuits founded Buffalo's first Catholic college and named it after St. Peter Canisius, a 16th-century Jesuit theologian, scholar, evangelist, and educator.

As part of Canisius College, the high school was first located on Ellicott Street in downtown Buffalo; it quickly outgrew that location and moved to a building on Washington Street in 1872. In 1883, Canisius High School “was incorporated by the State of New York as the Academic Department of Canisius College”. In 1908, the boarding portion of the school was closed, and by September 1912 the high school served 379 boys. In December 1912, as Canisius College moved into new facilities at Main and Jefferson Streets in Buffalo, the Washington Street building was turned over to the exclusive use of the high school. In 1919, Fr. Robert Johnson “became the first rector of the separate high school community.” In September 1928, the high school received an independent charter, completing its separation from the college.

Campus

The current Canisius site is notable in many ways. Located at 1180 Delaware Avenue, just north of the Delaware Avenue Historic District, the facility is at home among the many architecturally-and historically significant residences in the area. The school sits just south of Gates Circle, with tree-lined parkways designed and built by Frederick Law Olmsted and Calvert Vaux leading to Delaware Park. Canisius is also located just east of the Elmwood Village, recently ranked the third-best neighborhood in America by the American Planning Association.

Construction on the present-day Koessler Academic Center, also known as Berchmans' Hall, was started in 1918 by George F. Rand Sr., founder and former president of Marine Midland Bank. The facility was originally built as a private residence in the Jacobethan style, with gables, steep green slate roofs, chimney pots, and mullioned windows.

The building was sold in 1924 to the Masons, who converted it into the Buffalo Masonic Consistory. The Masons made several additions to the building, including a large marble foyer, a pool, Turkish baths, bowling alleys, and locker rooms. This new construction was designed by Buffalo City Hall chief architect John Wade.

The Masons are also responsible for Canisius' unique auditorium, which boasted, at the time of its construction, the largest continuous, free-spanning balcony in the United States, custom-made French chandeliers, and an advanced electrical lighting system, part of which is currently stored in the Smithsonian archives. This lighting system included a stained glass sun built into the ceiling, with hundreds of individual "stars" mimicking the night sky, and a blue band representing the Milky Way.

The Jesuits purchased the building from the City of Buffalo in 1944 for $92,000. Soon after, the Beecher Classroom Wing was added to the south of the structure, opening in 1948. A Jesuit residence (Frauenheim Hall) was added to the northwest side of the building. In about 1956, the adjacent Milburn House, site of the death of President William McKinley, was demolished to make way for a parking lot. It had been an apartment building since 1919 but had fallen into a state of significant disrepair by the time of its demolition.

In November 2007, the school unveiled a $14 million plan to upgrade its campus. Frauenheim Hall was demolished and replaced by the state-of-the-art Bernard J. Kennedy Field House, with a seating capacity of over 1,000 for basketball games and other indoor sporting events. A new Math and Science center, the Montante Academic Wing, stands connected to the Beecher Classroom Wing, adjoining West Ferry Street. Additionally, administrative offices have moved east across Delaware Avenue. In 2008, the Robert J. Stransky Memorial Athletic Complex opened in the suburb of West Seneca.

The campus has continued to expand in recent years. The school's weight room underwent a six-figure, extensive renovation in 2012, and in May 2017, the school announced it had acquired the Conners Mansion, located next to the main campus on the opposite side of West Ferry Street. The Delaware Avenue campus now includes in excess of 100,000 square footage of educational space via three mansions - the Rand Mansion (1180 Delaware Avenue), Welch Mansion (1193 Delaware Avenue), and Conners Mansion (1140 Delaware Avenue) - as well as the Auditorium, Kennedy Field House, and Montante Academic Wing.

Student body
As of 2013–14, Canisius enrolls approximately 1,885 students from Western New York and Southern Ontario, representing 4 counties, 42 cities and towns, and 147 grammar and middle schools. While the Catholic education system in Buffalo and the United States has declined since the start of the 21st Century, the Canisius student population has actually increased almost 20%, and today's student population is made of a mix of students from both Catholic and public grammar school backgrounds. The Class of 2009 produced 3 National Merit Finalists and 13 National Merit Commended Students, more than any other private high school in Western New York.

Canisius offers a wide variety of extracurricular activities, including Mock Trial, The Citadel newspaper, the Chanticleer literary magazine, the Arena yearbook, the National Honor Society, Students Against Destructive Decisions, Coding Club, Ski Club, Donate Life, Foursquare Club, the Gamers' Guild, Stage Crew, Speech and Debate, Wall Street Club, Writers' Club, The Meditators (Meditation Club), Chess Club, Innovative Thinking & Entrepreneurial Club (ITEC), and a league-champion Masterminds (Quiz Bowl) team.

Athletics
Canisius students also participate in a number of interscholastic sports; the school is a founding member of the Monsignor Martin Athletic Association. The Crusaders field teams in baseball, basketball, bowling, crew, cross country, football, golf, hockey, lacrosse, sailing, squash, soccer, swimming, tennis, track and field, volleyball, Rugby, and wrestling. Given the Crusaders' dominance in athletics in Western New York and New York State since 2000, Canisius has won the Monsignor Martin Association's "Supremacy Cup" (recognizing Catholic League's top athletic school through the aggregate of each varsity team's regular and postseason results) in all but two years this century.

The Canisius football team has become one of the most recognized programs in the United States over the last few years thanks in part to the successes of recent graduates like John Urschel '09 and Jimmy Gaines '10 as well as several other high-profile Division 1 recruits. The program, ranked in the top 5 in the northeast USA, was nationally profiled by Rivals in the summer of 2013. 
 
The Canisius rowing team has achieved significant national success in recent years. The Crusaders captured the Youth National Lightweight Eight Championship in 2006 and 2007, the Scholastic National Freshman Eight Championship in 2006 and 2008, the Scholastic Lightweight Eight Championship in 2009 and 2010, and the Scholastic National Junior Eight Championship in 2008. In 2019 the Senior Lightweight 4+ won all three major national championships including, the Scholastic National Championship, Canadian Secondary School Championship, and the Youth National Championship. The four also broke the record for the event at the Youth National Championship.

Traditionally, Canisius' biggest rival in sports has been St. Joseph's Collegiate Institute. Contests between the two institutions in any sport are well-attended and well-covered. The varsity football games between the two have annually been featured as part of the Great American Rivalry Series, which broadcasts high school games to U.S. troops around the world. Canisius has won seven straight and twelve of sixteen recent games against St. Joe's in football, a streak that matches Canisius' longest winning streak in the rivalry series that dates back to 1921.

Curriculum
Every student at Canisius is involved in a rigorous college-preparatory curriculum. Students are required to take seven college-preparatory courses per semester; over four years, the credit requirement is 30 credits. Honors and Advanced Placement sections exist in each of the curricular disciplines. Admissions are based on grades, an entrance exam, and various other criteria.

Because of its academic rigor and the fact that its diploma requirements exceed those of the state of New York, Canisius is one of only four Western New York secondary schools (with Buffalo Seminary, Nichols School, and The Park School of Buffalo) in which students are exempt from taking New York State's Regents Examinations. Instead, Canisius is accredited by the Middle States Association of Colleges and Schools and is a member of the New York State Association of Independent Schools.

Notable alumni

 Ansley B. Borkowski 1916, former New York State Assembly member and assembly clerk (1936-1964)
 Stan Bowman 1991, Former General Manager of the Chicago Blackhawks
 Most Rev. Joseph A. Burke 1905, Bishop of Buffalo from 1952 to 1962
 Steven Coppola 2002, 2008 Olympic rower
 Jim Cunningham 1954, standout basketball player at Fordham University
 John Curtin 1939, former US Attorney and US District Court Judge
 Charles S. Desmond 1913, Chief Judge of the New York Court of Appeals from 1960 to 1966
 Larry Felser 1951, former columnist for The Buffalo News and youngest recipient of the Dick McCann Memorial Award
 Tom Fontana 1969, TV writer/producer, Oz, The Jury and Homicide: Life on the Street
 Ed Don George 1924, 1928 Olympic wrestler and member of the Professional Wrestling Hall of Fame
 Mark Giangreco 1970, sportscaster at WLS-TV in Chicago
 John M. Granville 1993, United States Agency for International Development diplomat assassinated in Sudan
 Nick Grunzweig 1938, professional basketball player
 John J. LaFalce 1957, United States Congressman from 1975 to 2003
 Richard D. (Max) McCarthy 1945, member of the U.S. House of Representatives from New York's 39th congressional district from 1965 to 1971
 Phil McConkey 1975, former New York Giants wide receiver
 Donald Monan, S.J., 1942, former chancellor and president of Boston College
 Most Rev. Martin Neylon, S.J., 1937, Bishop of the Caroline Islands from 1971 to 1995
 Qadree Ollison 2014, running back currently playing for the Atlanta Falcons
 Rev. William O'Malley, S.J., 1949, first Catholic priest to portray a priest in a commercial motion picture
 Thomas Perez 1979, former Chairman of the Democratic Party, former United States Secretary of Labor, former Assistant Attorney General of the United States
 Donald Pinkel, M.D. 1944, medical doctor, pioneer in pediatric hematology and oncology, founding medical director and CEO of St. Jude Children's Research Hospital
 Larry Quinn 1970, former minority owner and president of the Buffalo Sabres
 Edwin J. Roland 1923, Commandant of the United States Coast Guard from 1962 to 1966
 Martin E. "Valerian Ruminski" Ruminski 1985, Metropolitan Opera singer
 Mark Russell 1950, comedian, pianist, and singer
 Tim Russert 1968, journalist, former host of NBC's Meet the Press
 Joseph Sansonese 1964, author and screenwriter
 Sibby Sisti 1938, former Major League Baseball player and 1946 Minor League Player of the Year
 B. John Tutuska 1930, former Sheriff of Erie County and the second County Executive of Erie County
 John Urschel 2009, William V. Campbell Trophy 2014 winner and 2014 NFL Draft draft pick by the Baltimore Ravens
 Lawrence J. Vilardo 1973, United States district judge of the United States District Court for the Western District of New York.
 Roy Vongtama 1992, oncologist and actor most known for his role in TLC's Untold Stories of the E.R.

References

External links
 

Boys' schools in New York (state)
Catholic secondary schools in New York (state)
Educational institutions established in 1870
Jesuit high schools in the United States
High schools in Buffalo, New York
1870 establishments in New York (state)